Andrei Palii (1 May 1940 – 25 February 2021) was a Moldovan agronomist. He was an elected corresponding member of the Academy of Sciences of Moldova and was inducted into the Order of Work Glory.

References

1940 births
2021 deaths
Agronomists
Moldovan scientists
People from Telenești District
Recipients of the Order of Work Glory